The Madelung equations, or the equations of quantum hydrodynamics, are Erwin Madelung's equivalent alternative formulation of the Schrödinger equation, written in terms of hydrodynamical variables, similar to the Navier–Stokes equations of fluid dynamics. The derivation of the Madelung equations is similar to the de Broglie–Bohm formulation, which represents the Schrödinger equation as a quantum Hamilton–Jacobi equation.

Equations
The Madelung equations are quantum Euler equations:

where
  is the flow velocity,
  is the mass density,
  is the Bohm quantum potential,
  is the potential from the Schrödinger equation.

The circulation of the flow velocity field along any closed path obeys the auxiliary condition , .

Derivation 
The Madelung equations are derived by writing the wavefunction in polar form:

and substituting this form into the Schrödinger equation

The flow velocity is defined by

from which we also find that

where  is the probability current of standard quantum mechanics.

The quantum force, which is the negative of the gradient of the quantum potential, can also be written in terms of the quantum pressure tensor:

where 

The integral energy stored in the quantum pressure tensor is proportional to the Fisher information, which accounts for the quality of measurements. Thus, according to the Cramér–Rao bound, the Heisenberg uncertainty principle is equivalent to a standard inequality for the efficiency of measurements. The thermodynamic definition of the quantum chemical potential

follows from the hydrostatic force balance above:

According to thermodynamics, at equilibrium the chemical potential is constant everywhere, which corresponds straightforwardly to the stationary Schrödinger equation. Therefore, the eigenvalues of the Schrödinger equation are free energies, which differ from the internal energies of the system. The particle internal energy is calculated as

and is related to the local Carl Friedrich von Weizsäcker correction. In the case of a quantum harmonic oscillator, for instance, one can easily show that the zero-point energy is the value of the oscillator chemical potential, while the oscillator internal energy is zero in the ground state, . Hence, the zero point energy represents the energy to place a static oscillator in vacuum, which shows again that the vacuum fluctuations are the reason for quantum mechanics.

See also 
 Quantum potential
 Quantum hydrodynamics
 Bohmian quantum mechanics
 Pilot wave theory

References

Further reading
  
 

Partial differential equations
Quantum mechanics